The Philip and Sarah Belz School of Jewish Music is a music school that focuses on Jewish music. It is part of Yeshiva University and its Rabbi Isaac Elchanan Theological Seminary in New York City. Classes are held in the Schottenstein Center on Yeshiva University's Wilf Campus in Manhattan.  Courses include nusah hatefilah (prayer chant), cantillation (biblical chant), voice, piano, music theory, history of Jewish music and liturgy, safrut (Hebrew calligraphy), and Sephardic hazzanut (cantorial).

Cantor Bernard Beer serves as the Director of the school. Previous to him, Cantor Macy Nulman served as director.

Faculty
Cantor Gabriel Abraham Shrem (late 1970s)
Cantor Moshe Tessone
Cantor Joseph Malovany
Cantor Sherwood Goffin

See also
Religious Jewish music

External links 
School website

Yeshiva University
Music schools in New York City
1954 establishments in New York City
Educational institutions established in 1954
Jewish music